14th Street station may refer to:
 14th Street station (PATH)
 14th Street – Eighth Avenue (New York City Subway)
 14th Street / Sixth Avenue (New York City Subway)
 14th Street – Union Square (New York City Subway)